Unityville is an unincorporated small rural village in Jordan Township, Lycoming County, Pennsylvania, United States. Unityville has a post office with ZIP code 17774, and a volunteer fire department. Google Maps drove along the highway outskirts but did not bother videographing the village itself.

References

Unincorporated communities in Lycoming County, Pennsylvania
Unincorporated communities in Pennsylvania